Nepal Human Rights International Film Festival is an annual film festival in Nepal for feature films. The festival was established in 2010.

References

External links 

 

Film festivals in Nepal
2010 establishments in Nepal